Bikki Sunazawa (also Bikky Sunazawa, Hisao Sunazawa) (砂澤ビッキ) (March 6, 1931 — January 25, 1989) was a Japanese self-taught woodcarver, painter, and sculptor of Ainu origin. Sunazawa is respected for helping make the Ainu culture known to the world through his works performed in the Ainu manner. Sunazawa is also known for designing the Ainu flag in 1971. His son Oki, an Ainu Japanese musician, applies the same approach to music.

Biography

Early years
He was born as Hisao Sunazawa in 1931 to parents Koa-kanno and Peramonkoro Sunazawa who were prominent figures in the movement for Ainu land and civil rights. "Bikki" was a nickname from his boyhood. His mother Peramonkoro was also one of the most respected Japan's textile artists of the twentieth century. In his late teens, Sunazawa worked with his family and other people to establish a new settlement. He left Hokkaido for Tokyo at the age of 21 to get caught up in the Japan's avant-garde art world of the 1950s and 1960s. He was later recognized as a leading sculptor in Japanese post-war art. By the 1970s, he returned to Hokkaido and was heavily involved in the Ainu liberation movement.

Later years
Having to disguise his Ainu art because of the ban imposed by the Japanese in the early twentieth century, Sunazawa devoted all his life to the defense of the Ainu culture. He was one of the first initiators of establishing connections with the Native American tribes, through the exhibition of some of his sculptures in British Columbia where he settled for a time. With his fame growing, he continued to use his art to disseminate Ainu culture via explanations of his creations, interviews, relations within the artistic community, and so on.

As a sign of respect, two Japanese amateur astronomers, Kin Endate and Kazuro Watanabe, gave his name to the minor planet 5372 that they discovered on November 29, 1987.

Death
Bikki Sunazawa died on January 25, 1989, because of bone marrow cancer in the Sapporo Aiiku Hospital. The Sunazawa's sculptures are still on display, and his studio "Sun More" is open to the public at Otoineppu, near the Teshio River on Hokkaido Island.

References

1931 births
1989 deaths
Deaths from multiple myeloma
Modern sculptors
Japanese sculptors
Modern painters
Japanese painters
Japanese Ainu people
Ainu artists
Deaths from cancer in Japan